Canadian Military Pattern (CMP) trucks were mutually coherent ranges of military trucks, made in large numbers, in several classes and numerous versions, by Canada's branches of the U.S. 'Big Three' auto-makers during World War II, compliant to British Army specifications, primarily intended for use in the armies of the British Commonwealth allies, but also serving in other units of the British Empire.

Canadian factories produced some 850,000 vehicles in World War II, including some 50,000 armoured vehicles, self-propelled guns and tanks, but the greatest significance is given to the vast majority – over 800,000 – of trucks and light wheeled vehicles, produced by Ford, GM and Chrysler of Canada.

Until the currency restrictions of the late 1940s, the Canadian automotive industry's output provided a major part of British Empire countries vehicles. These territories levied reduced, "Imperial preference", duties on Canadian products, usually made by Canadian subsidiaries of the big U.S. auto manufacturers. In the late 1930s, Canada started drawing up standard designs, to prepare for the beginning of the war, which involved a unique and historic design and production collaboration between rival giant car-makers, especially Ford Canada and GM of Canada.

Canadian Military Pattern trucks not only motorized the militaries of Britain, Canada, Australia and New Zealand, but were also sent to the Soviet Union after the Nazi invasion, as part of Canada's Gift and Mutual Aid program to the Allies, comparable to the U.S. Lend-Lease Act.

During the War, CMP trucks saw service around the world in the North African campaign, the Allied invasion of Sicily, the Italian Campaign, the Eastern Front, the Burma campaign, the Philippines, the liberation of Northwest Europe, and the Western Allied invasion of Germany. CMP trucks also served in post-war conflicts in Indonesia, French Indochina, and the Portuguese colonies in Africa.

The United Kingdom's official History of the Second World War called Canada's war-time production of soft-skinned trucks, including the CMP class, the country's most important contribution to Allied victory. Canada's trucks are considered to have "..put the British Army on wheels" – in the North African Campaign, the British Eighth Army fought Panzer Army Africa using almost exclusively CMP trucks; and the Allied progress from Sicily, through Italy and France, depended heavily on the Canadian trucks. By the end of the war, Canada's vast supply of trucks provided a vehicle for every three soldiers in the field – compared to one vehicle per seven American soldiers, making it the most mobile army in the world.

History
The rise to power in Germany of Hitler and the Nazi party in 1933 led to discussions in the mid-1930s between the British War Office and the Canadian Army concerning the possible production of military vehicles in Canada. During the First World War Canadian land forces had participated as a corps in the British Army. In any future conflict it was assumed that Canadian forces would again be tightly integrated with those of the Mother Country, and so it would be essential that Canadian-manufactured equipment be compatible with British standards and specifications.

Early in 1937, the Ford Motor Company of Canada and General Motors of Canada Ltd were each invited by the Canadian Department of National Defence to produce a Canadian prototype of a 15-hundredweight (cwt)  ¾-ton U.S.) payload rating, light infantry truck similar to the Morris CS8 that had then been recently adopted by the British War Office. By 1938, Canadian military authorities had shifted their interest to heavier 4x4 and 6x4 designs. In that year, Ford and General Motors of Canada Limited were invited to produce prototypes of a 6x4 medium artillery tractor derived from the British 6x4 Scammell Pioneer. By 1939, plans had been prepared for the mass production in Canada of a range of military vehicles based on fairly strict CMP British specifications. These trucks were originally designated "Department of National Defence (DND) Pattern"; however, when production volumes increased and it became clear that the Canadian-built vehicles were to serve widely in the forces of other countries, the class of trucks was redesignated "Canadian Military Pattern" (CMP). At the outbreak of World War II, Canada's large and modern automobile industry was shifted over to the production of military vehicles outproducing Germany.

Initially intended for Canadian military use, the vehicles were soon taken on by all British and Commonwealth forces.  While the Dunkirk evacuation in the spring of 1940 succeeded in rescuing close to 340,000 Allied soldiers who had been encircled by the invading German army, the British Expeditionary Force had been required to abandon most of its military vehicles in France. It then became an urgent need to replace those losses and to provide new vehicles to equip the rapidly expanding armed forces of the Commonwealth.  CMP vehicles, based on the British specification and with large manufacturing capacity, were the logical answer.

Production

Canadian factories produced around 850,000 vehicles in World War II, including some 50,000 armoured vehicles, self-propelled guns, and tanks. But of greater significance was the much larger number – more than 800,000 units – of trucks and light wheeled vehicles, produced by Ford, General Motors, and Chrysler of Canada. Thanks to a large pre-war automotive sector, Canada's great wartime achievement was to build more military trucks than the main Axis nations – Germany, Italy, and Japan – combined, matching the demands of mobile warfare in the age of blitzkrieg.

Canada's military truck production focused predominantly on a broad range of medium-rated vehicles. Light jeeps and trucks over 3 tons capacity, required by the Canadian Army, were purchased from outside suppliers. Canadian industry production included both modified civilian commercial designs (306,000 of which were classified as "Modified Conventional Pattern", MCP), as well as dedicated military-purpose designs, conforming to the Canadian Military Pattern specification, in roughly equal numbers.

Most CMP trucks were manufactured by the Canadian Chevrolet division of General Motors, and Ford Motor Company of Canada. The two manufacturers quickly ramped up their Canadian production, by utilizing the reserve production capacity that had remained idle ever since the Great Depression, and through an unusual act of collaboration between the two rival companies, using of interchangeable components. A smaller number of CMP trucks were assembled from Canadian-made chassis and parts, typically first built on Canadian production lines, then broken (knocked) down, crated, shipped overseas, and re-assembled in Britain, Australia, New Zealand, South Africa (2,600), India (9,500), Italy, and Egypt. Following British convention, CMP trucks had right hand drive even though most of them were built in Canada, which primarily used left-hand drive vehicles. The CMP specification proved versatile, and it formed the basis of a wide variety of different truck types and even some armoured vehicles. There were no less than ninety types of CMP army vehicles, on twelve different chassis, including three different types of wireless trucks, four ambulance types, and thirteen field workshop vehicles. In Australian service (almost always with the No. 13 cab), the vehicles were known as the "Chev Blitz" or the "Ford Blitz".

Around 410,000 CMP trucks were manufactured in Canada, with GM contributing 201,000 and Ford making the remainder. The most prevalent models were 4x4, 3-ton trucks (common types were the Chevrolet C60S and C60L, and the equivalent Ford F60S and F60L), with just over 209,000 vehicles made. Additionally, Chrysler was enlisted to produce another 180,000 Dodge trucks, just over three quarters of which were 3-ton trucks. These were to also be used in the CMP role, although they differed somewhat from the CMP pattern, being fitted with standard Dodge control cabins, on -longer wheelbases, and mostly being two-wheel drive. Furthermore, roughly 9,500 additional bare 4x4 CMP chassis were made, mainly for conversion to armoured cars and other vehicles in Allied countries.

Canada's production of CMP trucks alone exceeded the total military truck production of Nazi Germany. The British History of the Second World War (the United Kingdom's official history of the war) argues that the production of soft-skinned trucks, including the CMP truck class, was Canada's most important contribution to the eventual Allied victory.

After 1945, newly manufactured and modified war surplus CMP trucks were used in several European armies (e.g. the Netherlands, Belgium, Denmark, Norway, Portugal, Spain), and around the world (e.g., South Africa, Argentina, Jordan, South Vietnam, and Malaya). CMP trucks were adapted after the war for a variety of civilian roles including forestry, grain transport, fire-fighting, and snowplowing. In Malaysia, after the Malayan Emergency, many CMP trucks were converted to log transporters or off-road trucks at construction sites with upgraded brake systems and more powerful engines.

Canadian Military Pattern types

An American-made  GMC straight-6 engine powered the C60X 3-ton truck.

The Ford and Chevrolet trucks shared a standard cab design, which evolved over the years of production. The first (designed at Ford by Sid Swallow), second and third cab designs were called No. 11, 12 and 13, respectively. The first two type were similar, the main difference being a two-part radiator grille in No.12 cab (its upper part was opened with a bonnet, which was known as the "Alligator cab"). The final No. 13 cab, an entirely Canadian design made from late 1941 until the end of the war, had the two flat panes of the windscreen angled slightly downward to minimize the glare from the sun and to avoid causing strong reflections that would be observable from aircraft.

All the CMP cab designs had a short, "cab forward" configuration that gave CMP trucks their distinctive pug-nosed profile. This design was required to meet the original British specifications for a compact truck design that would be more efficient to transport by ship. The specifications also demanded right-hand drive.

Internally the cab had to accommodate the comparatively large North American engines and it was generally cramped. The standard cabs were then matched up with a variety of standard chassis, drive trains and body designs. Chevrolet-built vehicles could be recognised by the radiator grille mesh being of a diamond pattern, whereas Ford-built ones had grilles formed of a square mesh.

Dodge production started later.  Early prototypes used the No. 13 cab, but production vehicles retained a commercial cab and longer conventional control similar to MCP vehicles.  This enabled more rapid production, while retaining similar specifications for chassis, drive, and mounting of vehicle rear bodies.

The production of CMP truck bodies in Canada was subcontracted out to smaller companies in Ontario and Manitoba, organized into the wartime "Steel Body Manufacturers Association" by the Department of Munitions and Supply. The wide variety of truck body designs included general service (GS) / troop carrier, fuel / water tanker, vehicle recovery (tow truck), field ambulance, dental clinic, mobile laundry, wireless house (radio HQ), machinery (machine shop / welding station), folding boat transport, artillery tractor, and anti-tank gun portee.

In the list below, a drive specification of NxM means that the vehicle has a total of N wheels and that M of those wheels are driven. The military specifications did not permit more than two wheels per axle. The British standard load capacities of 8 cwt (400 kg), 15 cwt (760 kg), 30 cwt (1,525 kg) and 60 cwt (3050 kg) correspond roughly to the American loads of 1/2, 3/4 ton, 1.5, and 3 short tons, respectively. The 60-cwt CMP trucks were usually called 3-ton lorries or trucks (60 cwt being 3 long tons).

Chevrolet, General Motors
Chevrolet C8 (4x2, 101-inch wheelbase, 8 cwt)
Chevrolet C8A Heavy Utility Truck (4x4, 101 inch wheelbase, 8 cwt)Produced in Wireless (HUW), Ambulance (HUA), Personnel (HUP), Machinery ZL (mobile radio repair shop) and Computer (accounting, payroll) configurations
Chevrolet C15 (4x2, 101-inch wheelbase, 15 cwt)
Chevrolet C15A (4x4, 101-inch wheelbase, 15 cwt)
Chevrolet C15TA Armoured Truck (4x4, 101 inch wheelbase, 15 cwt)
Chevrolet C30 (4x4, 134 inch wheelbase, 30 cwt)
Chevrolet C60S (4x4, 134 inch wheelbase, 3 ton)
Chevrolet C60L (4x4, 158 inch wheelbase, 3 ton)
Chevrolet C60X – C60 chassis with 6x6 drive, 160 inch +52 inch wheelbase, 3 ton, 270 cu. in. GMC straight-6 engine)
Chevrolet CGT Field Artillery tractor (4x4, 101 inch wheelbase)

As well as trucks, CMP chassis were used for the Fox Armoured Car, the design of the British Humber Armoured Car adapted for production by GM. 
General Motors Canada built 1761 Otter Light Reconnaissance Cars, which was an adaption of the Humber Light Reconnaissance Car Mark III for a C15 chassis

Ford

The Ford Lynx Scout Car, also known as ""Car, Scout, Ford Mark I", (4x4, 101 inch wheelbase), was the hull of Daimler Dingo on a CMP chassis.

Dodge (Chrysler Canada) 

Chrysler of Canada built about 180,000 Dodge military trucks from 1939 to 1945, most of which for CMP role, and following the same naming convention – three quarters of which were 3ton models of various D60 (Dodge T-110) types.

To achieve a quick increase in output of trucks that provided equal functionality, it was deemed acceptable for the Dodges to forgo the standardized cab used on Fords and Chevrolets; and like the other two automakers, Dodge fitted its own engines. But although regular Dodge cabs were fitted, they were right hand drive (except for those for Canadian domestic use.) and had a gunner's hatch in the roof. Initial production D60s had 8.25x20 tires and dual rear wheels, they were subsequently switched over to the larger, CMP specification 10.50x16 size, and axles with single rear wheels, as well as being fitted with British pattern rear bodies. Operator's and technical manuals for the Dodges also mirrored the Ford and GM CMP manuals. Most of Dodge's models were two-wheel drive, with a high and low-range rear axle.

All Dodges were powered by the Chrysler straight-six flathead gasoline engines – the D60 models'  engine delivered  at 3,600 rpm.

The initial 60 cwt (3-ton) Dodge types (engineering codes T110L-S, T110L-3, T110L-4, as well as the later T110L-14) were not formally D60. leaving 124,961, or 91% of the 3ton trucks with a CMP-type name-code (based on serial nrs.); or including the D8As and D15 units, a total of 156,829 (or 87%) of Canada's Dodge trucks received a CMP type-code.

Winch capacity of the D3/4 was 
The first, wider batch were also referred to as 2M1A, and the second, narrower series as the 2M2A.

Outside Canada
Chassis and vehicle production was licensed to Australia, allowing local production, while other vehicles were shipped to Britain in part-assembled "knocked down" form.  These were delivered as kits, and had final assembly in factories in Britain.  Air portable versions had the top half of the cab superstructure and exterior components stowed to allow the vehicles to fit in the hold of transport aircraft, which could easily be re-fitted on receipt in theatre.

Bare chassis were created for alternative bodies to be fitted, reducing the shipping requirement to India.  Bodies for these vehicles were locally produced in India from available materials, frequently built entirely from wood, creating a diverse range of "Indian Pattern" vehicles.

To meet the pressing demand for military vehicles during World War II, several Commonwealth countries designed light armoured vehicles based on CMP chassis made in Canada.  Special chassis were created to aid in this purpose, featuring rear mounted engines and central steering positions.  Armoured cars used these or standard chassis depending on design and availability.

Ruskin Motor Bodies Pty Ltd and Ford Motor Company of Australia Rover Light Armoured Car (4x4, 134.25-inch and 158.25-inch wheelbases) – built on Ford 3-ton CMP chassis
General Motors Holden Ltd Rhino Heavy Armoured Car (4x4, 101-inch wheelbase) – prototype only
General Motors Holden Ltd 6x6 Heavy Armoured Car (6x6, 158-inch wheelbase)
Indian Railways Armoured Carrier Wheeled Indian Pattern (ACV-IP) (4x4, 101"? wheelbase) – most used CMP chassis
South African Reconnaissance Car, also called the Marmon-Herrington Armoured Car (4x4, various wheelbases)
Beaverette NZ, the New Zealand version of the British Standard Beaverette armoured car
C8AX "Puddlejumper" (4x4, 101-inch wheelbase, 8 cwt), variant created in New Zealand based on the C8A chassis

A number of Indian Pattern vehicles also had armoured bodies built, creating armoured trucks.

See also
List of military equipment of the Canadian Army during the Second World War
CMP FAT
Morris C8 Field Artillery Tractor
Military history of Canada during the Second World War

Footnotes

References
Notes

Bibliography
Gregg, William, (ed.), Blueprint for Victory: The story of military vehicle design and production in Canada from 1937–45, The Canadian Military Historical Society, Rockwood, Ontario, 1981, .

External links 

Maple Leaf Up's extensive website on CMP Trucks
Old CMP.net
CMP Trucks at the War&Peace Show 2008

Military trucks of Canada
World War II military equipment of Canada
World War II vehicles of the United Kingdom
Military vehicles introduced from 1940 to 1944